The 1970 American 500 was a NASCAR Grand National Series event that was held on November 15, 1970, at North Carolina Motor Speedway in Rockingham, North Carolina. Jim Paschal qualified the #40 vehicle for Pete Hamilton.

Race report
Twenty thousand people watched Cale Yarborough win the race which lasted 4 hours, 14 minutes, and 24 seconds. There were seven cautions that lasted for forty-six laps and the margin of victory was four seconds. As the penultimate race in NASCAR's Grand National era, this race was crucial for people wanting to win the 1970 NASCAR Grand National Championship. Bobby Isaac finished the race in 7th place, good enough for him to clinch the championship.

492 laps were completed on the paved oval track spanning . The winner's purse was $20,445 ($ when adjusted for inflation) while last place (40th) paid $540 ($ when adjusted for inflation). Drivers who were eliminated from the race had to deal with engine problems, crashes, transmission problems, and problems with their fan pulley (in addition to their rear end). Pete Hamilton would drive in his final race for Petty Enterprises here while Cale Yarborough would complete his final race for the Wood Brothers. Future winning team owner Hoss Ellington would retire from driving after this race. Cale Yarborough would eventually transfer himself to the USAC Indy Car Series in 1971.

Notable crew chiefs in this race included Herb Nab, Junie Donlavey, Harry Hyde, Dale Inman, Maurice Petty, Tom Vandiver and Banjo Matthews.

Qualifying

Failed to qualify: Dick Poling (#65), Roy Mayne (#46)

Finishing order
Section reference: 

 Cale Yarborough
 David Pearson
 Bobby Allison
 Donnie Allison
 Buddy Baker
 Richard Petty
 Bobby Isaac
 James Hylton
 Friday Hassler
 Buddy Young
 Joe Frasson
 Neil Castles
 Elmo Langley
 Jabe Thomas
 Pete Hamilton*
 Jim Vandiver
 Ben Arnold
 J.D. McDuffie
 Raymond Williams
 Wendell Scott*
 Cecil Gordon
 Johnny Halford
 Roy Mayne
 Larry Baumel
 Bill Champion*
 Frank Warren
 Hoss Ellington*
 Henley Gray
 LeeRoy Yarbrough*
 John Sears*
 Charlie Glotzbach*
 Dave Marcis*
 Benny Parsons*
 Bill Seifert*
 Tiny Lund*
 Bill Shirey*
 Bill Dennis*
 Roy Tyner*
 Dick Brooks*
 Buddy Arrington*

* Driver failed to finish race

Timeline
Section reference:

References

American 500
American 500
NASCAR races at Rockingham Speedway